Black Octopus is a 1985 Argentine TV mini-series (624 min) directed by Marta Reguera and written by Luis Murillo with Narciso Ibáñez Menta in the main role.

Plot
A mysterious writer of detective fiction blackmails four 'respectable' men with a criminal past to force them to murder a stranger at random. A small black octopus toy is left beside the corpse of the victims.

Cast

 Narciso Ibáñez Menta as Arturo Leblanc / Héctor de Rodas / Claudio Leonardi
 Osvaldo Brandi as Méndez
 Héctor Biuchet as Guevara
 Ariel Keller as Velázquez
 Juan Carlos Puppo as Duarte
 Beatriz Día Quiroga as Martha
 Tony Vilas as Armando
 Oscar Ferrigno as Police Inspector Alejandro Mendoza
 Juan Carlos Galván as Detective Marcos de la Hoz
 Erika Wallner as Eva Rinaldi
 Cristina Lemercier as Mara Salerno
 Wagner Mautone as Alfredo Heredia
 Zelmar Gueñol as mortuary manager
 Villanueva Cosse as Martín Gálvez
 Max Berliner as collaborator of a radio programme
 Alfredo Iglesias as Enrique Ferrante

References

External links
 5]

Argentine drama television series
1985 Argentine television series debuts
1985 Argentine television series endings